Saher Al-Suraihi (born 29 April 1998) is a Saudi Arabian professional footballer who plays as a winger.

Career
Al-Suraihi started his career at the youth team of Al-Ittihad. He signed his first professional contract with Al-Ittihad on July 5, 2017 . He made his professional debut for Al-Ittihad against Al-Raed the Pro League, replacing Mohammed Reeman on April 18, 2018 . and he signed contract with Al-Nojoom on loan from Al-Ittihad on August 31, 2019 . His loan to the Al-Nojoom was canceled and he signed contract with Al-Thoqbah on loan from Al-Ittihad on January 31, 2020, he signed contract with Jeddah on loan from Al-Ittihad on October 11, 2020 . On 17 August 2021, Al-Suraihi joined Al-Kawkab on loan.

References

External links 
 

1998 births
Living people
Saudi Arabian footballers
Ittihad FC players
Al-Nojoom FC players
Al-Thoqbah Club players
Jeddah Club players
Al-Kawkab FC players
Saudi Professional League players
Saudi First Division League players
Association football wingers